The singles discography of Roc Nation, an American company and record label, consists of five singles, four collaborative singles and eight charted songs by Jay-Z, four by J. Cole, three by Alexis Jordan, ten (four official) by Willow Smith and three by Rita Ora.

Jay-Z

Singles

Collaborative singles

Other charted songs

J. Cole

Singles

Other charted songs

Alexis Jordan

Singles

Willow Smith

Singles

Rita Ora

Singles

Rihanna

Singles

Footnotes

See also
 Roc Nation albums discography

Notes

References

External links
 Official website — RocNation.com

Discographies of American record labels
Hip hop discographies
Singles discography